Quincy Osei (born 8 December 1989) is a Ghanaian football midfielder who plays for Alsancak Yeşilova SK.

Career
He plays as central midfielder or central back and is 1.86 m height.

Before moving abroad he played with Bechem United in Ghana. He moved to Finland signing with FC Haka. During 2010 he played with FC Haka in the Veikkausliiga where he made 22 league appearances during that season.

In summer 2011 he moved to Serbia and after a month-long trial on August 29 he signed a 3-year contract with FK Hajduk Kula.  During the winter break of the 2011–12 season he left Hajduk Kula and joined Club Valencia playing in the Dhivehi League, the highest football league of the Maldives.

In the first half of 2014 he played in Iceland with BÍ/Bolungarvík having played 2 matches in the 2014 Deildabikar.  Next he moved to Saudi Arabian first division league side Hetten FC.  With Hetten FC he played in the 2014 King Cup of Champions.

In July 2016, Osei joined Doğan Türk Birliği. He joined the club again in August 2017. He left the club again at the end of 2017.

On 14 March 2019, IF Gnistan announced that they had signed with Osei for one game against VPS in the Finnish Cup. In April 2019, he joined FC Viikingit.

National team
Quincy Osei has been part of the Ghana Olympic team during the 2011 CAF U-23 Championship which was the qualifying tournament for the 2012 London Olympics.

http://ghheadlines.com/agency/ghana-web-/20180701/81156258/ghanaian-attacker-quincy-osei-grabs-winner-for-ktp-in-win-over-ac-kajaani

References

External sources
 
 palloliitto.fi

1989 births
Living people
Footballers from Accra
Ghanaian footballers
Ghanaian expatriate footballers
Association football midfielders
Bechem United FC players
FC Haka players
FK Hajduk Kula players
Club Valencia players
Quincy Osei
Hetten FC players
Kotkan Työväen Palloilijat players
IF Gnistan players
FC Viikingit players
Veikkausliiga players
Kakkonen players
Serbian SuperLiga players
Saudi First Division League players
Expatriate footballers in Finland
Expatriate footballers in Serbia
Expatriate footballers in the Maldives
Expatriate footballers in Iceland
Expatriate footballers in Saudi Arabia
AC Kajaani players